John Hanes may refer to:

John Wesley Hanes I (1850–1903), American businessman, founder of Hanes Hosiery Mills
John Wesley Hanes II (1892–1987), American finance specialist, statesman
John Wesley Hanes III (1925–2018), American civil servant

See also
 John Haines (disambiguation)
 John Haynes (disambiguation)